Vitale Junior Roqica (born 13 February 1991) is a Fiji international rugby league footballer who plays as a  or  forward.

He played for the Cronulla-Sutherland Sharks in the NRL and the London Broncos in the Championship, and was contracted to the Newcastle Knights in the National Rugby League.

Early life
Roqica was born in Camperdown, New South Wales, Australia and is of Fijian descent. He played his junior football for the Concord Burwood Wolves and Holy Cross Rhinos, while participating in the Balmain Tigers development program before being signed by the Wests Tigers.

Playing career

Wests Tigers
Roqica played for the Wests Tigers' NYC team from 2008 to 2011.

Canterbury-Bankstown Bulldogs
In 2012, Roqica joined the Canterbury-Bankstown Bulldogs.

He failed to play a game in the NRL for Canterbury-Bankstown, but featured in their NSW Cup side.

Cronulla-Sutherland Sharks
In 2013, Roqica joined the Cronulla-Sutherland Sharks.

In Round 11 of the 2014 NRL season, Roqica made his NRL début for Cronulla-Sutherland against the South Sydney Rabbitohs.

Whilst contracted to Cronulla-Sutherland, Roqica spent most of playing time on the field for the Newtown club, playing in the New South Wales Cup and the rebranded Intrust Super Premiership NSW.

London Broncos
Roqica joined London ahead of the 2017 season.

Representative career
Roqica played for the New South Wales Catholic Colleges team when he was 17.

In 2009, Roqica played for the Australian schoolboys.

In 2013, Roqica was named in the Fiji squad for the 2013 Rugby League World Cup. He made his international début against Ireland. He scored the decisive try in Fiji's quarter-final victory over Samoa.

In May 2014, Roqica played for Fiji in the 2014 Pacific Rugby League International.

On 7 May 2016, Roqica played for Fiji against Papua New Guinea in the 2016 Melanesian Cup.

References

External links

London Broncos profile
2014 Cronulla-Sutherland Sharks profile
NRL profile
Player Statistics
2017 RLWC profile

1991 births
Living people
Australian people of I-Taukei Fijian descent
Australian rugby league players
Balmain Ryde-Eastwood Tigers players
Cronulla-Sutherland Sharks players
Fiji national rugby league team players
Lakes United Seagulls players
London Broncos players
Rugby league players from Sydney
Rugby league props
Rugby league second-rows